Eng is a Chinese, German, and Scandinavian surname, as well as a given name in various cultures.

Given name 
 Eng Abner Nangwale (1932–2013), Ugandan politician 
 Eng Bunker (1811–1874), Siamese-American conjoined twin brother of Chang Bunker
 Chong Eng (born 1974), Malaysian politician
 Eng Tow (born 1947), Singaporean contemporary artist

Surname

Origins 
Eng may be the spelling of multiple Chinese surnames, based on their pronunciation in different varieties of Chinese; they are listed below by their spelling in Hanyu Pinyin, which reflects the standard Mandarin pronunciation:

Wú, spelled Eng based on its Cantonese pronunciation
Wǔ, spelled Eng based on its Cantonese pronunciation
Róng (/荣), spelled Eng based on its Hokkien pronunciation
Wēng, spelled Eng based on its Teochew pronunciation
Yīng, spelled Eng based on its pronunciation in various Southern Min dialects (e.g. Hokkien ;)

Ng is another spelling of the Cantonese pronunciation of the first two surnames listed above. Chinese Americans in the Pacific Northwest tended to prefer the spelling Eng over Ng. The Cambodian surname Eng probably originates from the latter three surnames mentioned above.

As a German surname, Eng is a variant spelling of Enge, a topographic surname for a person who lived in a valley or other such narrow place, from German  'narrow'.

The Norwegian and Swedish surname Eng originated as an ornamental surname from Old Norse  and Swedish  'meadow'.

Statistics 
As of 2023, there were 910 people in Norway with the surname Eng.

The 2010 United States census found 10,862 people with the surname Eng, making it the 3,352nd-most-common name in the country. This represented an increase from 10,102 (3,246th-most-common) in the 2000 census. In both censuses, roughly three-quarters of the bearers of the surname identified as Asian and 14% as non-Hispanic white. It was the 179th-most-common surname among respondents to the 2000 census who identified as Asian.

People

Politics and government 
 Brynolf Eng (1910–1988), Swedish diplomat
 Eng Chhai Eang (born 1965), Cambodian politician 
 Hans Eng (1907–1995), Norwegian physician and Nazi collaborator
 Hughes Eng, Chinese-born Canadian activist
 Jakob Eng (1937–2022), Norwegian banker and politician
 John Eng (born 1942), American politician of Chinese descent in Washington State
 Mike Eng (born 1946), American politician of Chinese descent in California
 Suriani Abdullah (birth name Eng Ming Ching; 1924–2013), former central committee member of the Communist Party of Malaya
 Randall T. Eng (born 1947), mainland Chinese-born American jurist
 Roland Eng (born 1959), Cambodian diplomat
 Susan Eng, Canadian lawyer of Chinese descent, former chair of the Metro Toronto Police Services Board
 Sigrun Eng (born 1951), Norwegian politician

Sport 
 Bertil Eng (1930–2006), Swedish speed skater
 Charles Eng (died 1907), American wrestler
 Jacob Eng (born 2004), Norwegian football striker
 Martin Eng (born 1986), Norwegian biathlete
 Philipp Eng (born 1990), Austrian racing driver
 Tony Eng (born 1959), Swedish curler

Television and film 
 Dayyan Eng (born 1975), Taiwan-born American filmmaker
 Esther Eng (1914–1970), American filmmaker of Chinese descent
 Kenneth Eng, American filmmaker of Chinese descent
 Marny Eng (born 1969), Canadian stuntwoman
 Peppe Eng (born 1948), Swedish sports journalist
 Vickie Eng, American actress

Other 
 Charis Eng (born 1962), Singaporean-born American geneticist
 Diana Eng (born 1983), American fashion designer of Chinese descent
 Helga Eng (1875–1966), Norwegian psychologist and educationalist
 Janice J Eng (born 1963), Canadian neurologist
 Johnny Eng (born ), Hong Kong-born American criminal
 Mercedes Eng, Canadian writer of Chinese descent
 Phoebe Eng (born ), American writer of Chinese descent
 Richard Eng (born 1964), Hong Kong tutor of English

References

Multiple Chinese surnames
Cantonese-language surnames
Hokkien-language surnames
German-language surnames
Norwegian-language surnames
Swedish-language surnames